Ouranopithecus is a genus of extinct Eurasian great ape represented by two species, Ouranopithecus macedoniensis, a late Miocene (9.6–8.7 mya) hominoid from Greece and Ouranopithecus turkae, also from the late Miocene (8.7–7.4 mya) of Turkey.

The first specimen O. macedoniensis was discovered by French palaeontologists Louis de Bonis and Jean Melentis in 1977, and O. turkae by Turkish team led by Erksin Savaş Güleç in 2007. For a long time it was considered as similar (synonymous) to Graecopithecus and member of the genus Sivapithecus, which more discoveries proved otherwise.

Description and systematics
Based on O. macedoniensis''' dental and facial anatomy, it has been suggested that Ouranopithecus was actually a dryopithecine. However, it is probably more closely related to the Ponginae. Some researchers consider O. macedoniensis to be the last common ancestor of humans (hominins) and the other apes, and a forerunner to australopithecines and humans, although this is very controversial and not widely accepted. It is true that O. macedoniensis shares derived features with some early hominins (such as the frontal sinus, a cavity in the forehead), but they are almost certainly not closely related species. 

In 1984, British palaeontologists Peter Andrews and Lawrence B. Martin classified Graecopithecus and Ouranopithecus as synonyms (same taxon) and treated them as members of the genus Sivapithecus. However, comparative analysis showed that there is not enough data to support the synonymy.

When more O. macedoniensis fossils were discovered including part of the skull in the 1990s, it became apparent that O. macedoniensis and G. freybergi are distinct species. In the light of new data, in 1997, Australian palaeontologist David W. Cameron treated Graecopithecus as a valid genus based on taxonomic priority and renamed O. macedoniensis as Graecopithecus macedoniensis. However, better O. macedoniensis specimens were found including a new species Ouranopithecus turkae from Turkey that warranted separation of the genus.

In addition, a meticulous re-description of Graecopithecus specimens in 2017 further evidenced that Graecopithecus is more related to humans than to apes, while Ouranopithecus'' specimens have strict ape-like characters. Separate genus are therefore continued to be generally adopted.

See also

References

External links 

 Human Timeline (Interactive) – Smithsonian, National Museum of Natural History (August 2016).

Fossil taxa described in 1977
Miocene mammals of Europe
Miocene primates of Asia
Miocene primates of Europe
Prehistoric apes
Prehistoric primate genera
Prehistoric Greece